Yeon Gaesomun (594–666) was a powerful military dictator in the waning days of the Goguryeo kingdom, which was one of the Three Kingdoms of ancient Korea. He is remembered for his successful resistance against Tang China under Emperor Taizong and his son Emperor Gaozong.

Traditional Korean histories from Joseon painted Yeon Gaesomun as a despotic leader, whose cruel policies and disobedience to his monarch led to the fall of Goguryeo. However, his achievements in defending Goguryeo against Chinese onslaughts have inspired early Korean nationalist historians, most notably the 19th-century Korean historian and intellectual Sin Chaeho, to term Yeon Gaesomun the greatest hero in Korean history. In popular culture Yeon Gaesomun is often remembered as a exceptional soldier-statesman without equal in Korean history.

Biography
Yeon Gaesomun was born into the influential and distinguished Yeon family as the first son of Yeon Taejo, the prime minister of Goguryeo during the reigns of King Pyeongwon and King Yeongyang. His grandfather Yeon Ja-yu was also a prime minister.

Information about Yeon Gaesomun comes largely from the Samguk sagis biographical accounts of King Yeongnyu, King Bojang, and Yeon Gaesomun himself, and tomb engravings and biographical accounts, from the New Book of Tang, dedicated to his sons Yeon Namsaeng and Yeon Namsan.

Tang Chinese historical records give Yeon Gaesomun's surname as Cheon ( in Chinese, meaning "water spring"), because Yeon ( in Chinese, meaning "riverhead") was the given name of Emperor Gaozu, the founding emperor of Tang, and thus subject to the naming taboo by Chinese tradition. Yeon Gaesomun is also sometimes referred to as Gaegeum. In the Nihon Shoki, he appears as Iri Kasumi. Since both Yeon Gaesomun and Iri Kasumi are transcriptions from Chinese and Japanese intending to approximate his Korean name, his actual name can be reconstructed as "Eol Kasum".

Very little is known of Yeon Gaesomun's early days, until he became the Western Governor, where he oversaw the building of the Cheolli Jangseong, a network of military garrisons to defend Liaodong from Tang.

Yeon Gaesomun had at least three sons: (eldest to youngest) Yeon Namsaeng, Yeon Namgeon, and Yeon Namsan.

Overthrow of the throne
In the winter of 642, King Yeongnyu was apprehensive about Yeon Gaesomun and plotted with his other officials to kill him. When Yeon Gaesomun discovered the plot, he arranged a lavish banquet to celebrate his rise to the position of Eastern Governor to which one hundred of the opposing politicians of the nation were invited. Yeon Gaesomun ambushed and killed all one hundred politicians present, and then proceeded to the palace and murdered King Yeongnyu. According to traditional Chinese and Korean sources, Yeon Gaesomun's men dismembered the king's corpse and discarded it without proper ceremony.

After placing King Bojang,a nephew of King Yeongnyu, on the Goguryeo throne, Yeon Gaesomun appointed himself the Dae Magniji (generalissimo) and assumed absolute de facto control over Goguryeo affairs of state until his death around 666.

Yeon Gaesomun's coup d'état came as the culmination of a lengthy power struggle between those in the government who favored appeasement toward Tang China and those who advocated military confrontation; Yeon Gaesomun belonged to the hard-liners. Traditional Chinese and Korean historians assumed that Yeon Gaseomun's motive was simply his thirst for power, but many modern Korean historians assert that his motive was to make Goguryeo assume a tougher stance against Tang China, as opposed to King Yeongnyu who submitted to Tang for a peaceful diplomatic relationship. Yeon Gaesomun's role in the murder of King Yeongnyu was taken as the primary pretext for the failed Tang invasion of 645.

Wars with China

The series of wars between Goguryeo and Tang China comprise some of the most important events in the ancient history of Northeast Asia, leading to the Tang–Silla alliance, the ultimate demise of powerful Goguryeo, and the unification of the Korean Peninsula under Silla control. Yeon Gaesomun was a central protagonist in this series of conflicts, as well as its primary cause.

At the outset of his rule, Yeon Gaesomun took a brief conciliatory stance toward Tang China. For instance, he supported Taoism at the expense of Buddhism, and to this effect in 643, sent emissaries to the Tang court requesting Taoist sages, eight of whom were brought to Goguryeo. This gesture is considered by some historians as an effort to pacify Tang and buy time to prepare for the Tang invasion Yeon thought inevitable given his ambitions to annex Silla.

Relations with Tang deteriorated when Goguryeo launched new invasions of Silla. In 645, the first conflict of the Goguryeo–Tang War began and Emperor Taizong's noted military acumen enabled him to conquer a number of major Goguryeo border fortresses.

Eventually, however, Emperor Taizong's invasion was met with two major setbacks. First, his main army was stymied and bogged down for several months at Ansi Fortress due to the resistance of the celebrated commander Yang Manchun. Second, the elite marine force that he sent to take Pyongyang, Goguryeo's capital, was defeated by Yeon Gaesomun who, according to the Joseon Sanggosa, then immediately marched his legions to relieve Yang Manchun's forces at Ansi Fortress.

Emperor Taizong, caught between Yang Manchun's army in the front and Yeon Gaesomun's counter-attacking forces closing in from behind, as well as suffering from the harsh winter and dangerously low food supplies, was forced to retreat homeward. Before setting off, Emperor Taizong left behind 100 bolts of silk cloth out of respect to Yang Manchun. The retreat was difficult and many of his soldiers died. Emperor Taizong's campaign against Goguryeo was unsuccessful. However, he succeeded in inflicting heavy casualties on Goguryeo. Upon returning home, Emperor Taizong founded the Minzhong Temple, the oldest temple in Beijing, to commemorate his soldiers who died in Goguryeo. He invaded Goguryeo again in 647 and 648, but was defeated both times, and thus was unable to accomplish his ambition of conquering Goguryeo in his lifetime.

Conquering Goguryeo had been an obsession with Emperor Taizong, and after his death in 649, his son Emperor Gaozong continued his ambition. After the Tang-Silla alliance conquered Baekje, Emperor Gaozong invaded Goguryeo in 661 and 662. One of Yeon Gaesomun's greatest victories came in 662, when his forces defeated Tang general Pang Xiaotai and his Lingnan army at the Sasu River (probably Botong River). Pang Xiaotai and all his 13 sons were killed in combat. Famed Tang general Su Dingfang, who was instrumental in conquering Baekje, was unable to overcome Pyongyang's defenses and was forced to withdraw due to harsh snowstorms. With increasing domestic turmoil in China, Tang was once again forced to retreat.

However, Goguryeo's population and economy were severely damaged due to the long years of continuous warfare. Yeon Gaesomun died in 666 of a natural cause, and Goguryeo was thrown into chaos and further weakened by a succession struggle among his sons and younger brother, with his eldest son defecting to Tang and his younger brother defecting to Silla. Tang mounted a fresh invasion in 667, aided by Silla and the defector Yeon Namsaeng, and was finally able to conquer Goguryeo in 668.

Death
The most likely date of Yeon Gaesomun's death is that recorded on the tomb stele of his eldest son Yeon Namsaeng on the twenty-fourth year of the reign of King Bojang (665). However, the Samguk sagi records the year as 666, and the Nihon Shoki gives the year as the twenty-third year of the reign of King Bojang (664).

Legends
According to a local Chinese legend in the 19th-century Funing County Annals: during a campaign, Emperor Taizong was scouting ahead of his army and was almost captured when he discovered Yeon Gaesomun's encampment and was recognized by the latter, but narrowly escaped by hiding in a decrepit well; later, Emperor Taizong had a pagoda erected near the location.

Historical depictions
Tang and Silla sources portrayed Yeon Gaesomun as a brutal and arrogant dictator who carried five swords at a time, and had men prostrate themselves so that he could use their backs to mount and dismount his horse.

In popular culture
Yeon Gaesomun sometimes appears as a door god in Taoist temples in partnership with the Tang general Xue Rengui. In some Chinese legends, Xue Rengui and Yeon Gaesomun are the reincarnations of the White Tiger's Star and Azure Dragon's Star, respectively.

Film and television
Portrayed by Jo Kyung-hwan in the 1992 KBS TV series Chronicles of the Three Kingdoms.
Portrayed by Lee Won-jong in the 2003 film Once Upon a Time in a Battlefield and its 2011 sequel Battlefield Heroes.
Portrayed by Yoo Dong-geun, Lee Tae-gon and Eun Won-jae in the 2006-2007 SBS TV series Yeon Gaesomun.
Portrayed by Kim Jin-tae in the 2006–2007 KBS TV series Dae Jo Yeong.
Portrayed by Ko In-beom in the 2011 MBC TV series Gyebaek.
Portrayed by Choi Dong-joon in the 2012–2013 KBS TV series The King's Dream.
Portrayed by Choi Min-soo in the 2013 KBS2 TV series The Blade and Petal.
Portrayed by Yu Oh-seong in the 2018 film The Great Battle.

Literature
Yeon Gaesomun (under the name Gai Suwen) appears in Peking opera as the archvillain of the famed Tang general Xue Rengui, who rescues Emperor Taizong from Yeon Gaesomun's pursuit.

Yeon Gaesomun appears in numerous classical Chinese literature about Xue Rengui, who rescues Emperor Taizong from certain death at the hands of Yeon Gaesomun himself.

Age of Empires: World Domination, a mobile game produced in collaboration with series owner Microsoft, includes Yeon Gaesomun as a selectable hero of the Korean civilization.

See also
History of Korea
Three Kingdoms of Korea

References

Goguryeo people
Military history of Korea
Korean generals
7th-century heads of government
603 births
666 deaths
Generalissimos
Chinese gods
7th-century Korean people